The Lougheed Ministry was the combined Cabinet (called Executive Council of Alberta), chaired by Premier Peter Lougheed, and Ministers that governed Alberta from the 17th Alberta Legislature beginning on September 10, 1971, to mid-point of the 20th Alberta Legislature ending on November 1, 1985.

The Executive Council (commonly known as the cabinet) was made up of members of the Progressive Conservative Party of Alberta which held a majority of seats in the Legislative Assembly of Alberta. The cabinet was appointed by the Lieutenant Governor of Alberta on the advice of the Premier.

Peter Lougheed retired as Premier on November 1, 1985, ending the Lougheed Ministry, and was succeeded by Don Getty and the Getty Ministry.

Cabinet selection 
When selecting his Cabinets Lougheed took the approach that first-hand knowledge may be a determent to the success of the Minister, who he wanted to take on the role without any preconceived notions. For instance Hugh Horner a doctor was appointed Minister of Agriculture and Lou Hyndman a lawyer was appointed Minister of Education. Lougheed completely shuffled his Cabinet upon re-election in 1975 and 1979, with no Minister retaining the same position, although after the 1982 election he reappointed several Ministers to the same portfolios. Lougheed also oversaw an expansion of the size of Cabinet, which assisted in providing regional representation.

List of ministers

See also
Executive Council of Alberta
List of Alberta provincial ministers

References

Further reading 

 
 
 
 
 

Politics of Alberta
Executive Council of Alberta
1971 establishments in Alberta
1985 disestablishments in Alberta
Cabinets established in 1971
Cabinets disestablished in 1985